Elsamma Enna Aankutty is a 2010 Malayalam-language romantic comedy film directed by Lal Jose and written by M. Sindhuraj and Sangeeth Kollam starring Kunchacko Boban, Ann Augustine and Indrajith. The film was produced by Rejaputhra Visual Media and distributed by Lal Creations.

Plot
The setting of the story is a picturesque village in the high ranges of Kerala, called Balanpillai City. Elsamma is the eldest of four daughters of Maria Varkey. After her father's death, she started working as a newspaper agent/local reporter/delivery girl to earn extra income. Unnikrishnan, alias Palunni, is a milkman and close friend of Elsamma who never revealed his love towards her. Kunnel Paappan and Elsamma's family share close ties, almost like one family. Elsamma is also a staunch activist who wants to close down the local toddy shop run by a strongman Sugunan. This brings her into regular conflict with him as well as the Panchayat member Ramanan.

Paalunni confides his love for Elsamma to Paappan who promises to convey this to Elsamma when the time is right. Paappan's daughter-in-law passes away and his grandchildren Aby and his sister Sherin come to live with their grandparents in Balanpillai City. Aby is attracted to Elsamma and tries to flirt with her, hoping to have sex with her. Sherin dislikes her and is rude to her.

Sugunan calls Aby and his friends who are visiting the village and urges them to entrap Elsamma and her sisters and create disrepute so that Elsamma would leave his illicit liquor business alone. Aby tells Paappan and Maria that he wants to marry Elsamma. A wedding is arranged without Elsamma's knowledge or consent, and Paappan could not object, in spite of knowing that Paalunni likes Elsamma. Paalunni tearfully accepts the situation keeping in mind Elsamma and family's long-term well-being. Elsamma later catches Jerry, one of Aby's friends, in a compromising position with Aby's sister Sherin. She informs Aby of this through Paalunni. When Aby learns ofthis, he thrashes Jerry. In retaliation, Jerry discloses that Aby's proposal to marry Elsamma was only his last straw to get her after she had been turning down his advances. Aby's sister, pained upon knowing that Jerry did not love her but was only flirting with her, attempts to commit suicide but is saved in time. She apologises to Elsamma for having been consistently rude to her and they reconcile. Elsamma later forgives Aby but pleasantly turns down his proposal. Aby and his sister are taken to Dubai by their father, who promises to Paappan that they will return as better individuals. The movie ends with Elsamma also telling Paalunni that she loves him.

Cast

 Kunchacko Boban as Unnikrishnan a.k.a. Palunni
 Ann Augustine as Elsamma Varkey
 Indrajith as Aby George 
 Nedumudi Venu as Kunnel Pappan
 Janardhanan as Balanpillai
 Vijayaraghavan as Karippalli Sugunan
 Jagathy Sreekumar as Member Ramanan
 Maniyanpilla Raju as S.I. Sunandappan
 Suraj Venjaramood as Broker Thommachen
 Manikuttan as Jerry
 Sarath as Hari
 Prakash as Kunnel George
 Balachandran Chullikadu as Doctor
 Majeed as Priest
 Subeesh as Cleetus
 Master Abhinav as Suresh
 K.P.A.C.Lalitha as Maria Varkey
 Vani Kishore as Tresa Varkey
 Unnimaya as Leena Varkey
 Shaalin as Jessy Varkey
 Mrudula Murali as Sherine George
 Seema G. Nair as Omana
 Sreedevi Unni as Sharadamma
 Geetha Nair as Deenamma 
 Subi Suresh as Zainaba
 Thodupuzha Vasanthi as Mary Teacher
 Jeeja Surendran as Rajamma, Panchayat Secretary
 Kavitha as Baby Suresh's mother, Deepa
 Meera Nandan as Jeny

Soundtrack
The film's soundtrack is composed by Rajamani. Lyrics are penned by Rafeeq Ahammed.

Box office
The movie started slowly, shifted gears and had a smooth 100 day run in the cities becoming one of the major hits of 2010. 
Sify declared the film as a "super hit" and added that "the film will do Rs 3 crore from theatricals." The film collected more than  according to The Hindu.

Home video
The film was released on DVD by Central Home Entertainment in India, on 7 April 2011. Speed Audios released the overseas version DVD on the very next day.

References

External links
 

2010s Malayalam-language films
Indian romantic comedy films
Films shot in Munnar
Films directed by Lal Jose